Brown-Moore Blacksmith Shop is a historic blacksmith shop located at Luzerne Township, Fayette County, Pennsylvania.  The shop began operation in 1822, and remained open until 1939.  It is a rectangular brick building with a corrugated metal roof.  It has a rectangular wood frame wagon shop addition rebuilt in 1919 after a fire.  The shop has two large stone, hand-operated forges.

It was added to the National Register of Historic Places in 1992.

References

Blacksmith shops
Commercial buildings on the National Register of Historic Places in Pennsylvania
Commercial buildings completed in 1822
Buildings and structures in Fayette County, Pennsylvania
National Register of Historic Places in Fayette County, Pennsylvania
1822 establishments in Pennsylvania